Ulugbek Rashitov (born 23 March 2002) is an Uzbekistani taekwondo practitioner. In 2021, he won the gold medal in the 68 kg event at the 2020 Summer Olympics held in Tokyo, Japan. In 2019, he won the gold medal in the 58 kg event at the Military World Games held in Wuhan, China.

Career 
In 2019, he won the gold medal in the 55 kg event at the Asian Junior Taekwondo Championships.

In 2018, he won the silver medal in the boys' 48 kg event at the Summer Youth Olympics held in Buenos Aires, Argentina.

He represented Uzbekistan at the 2020 Summer Olympics in Tokyo, Japan. He won gold, beating Bradly Sinden of Great Britain in the final.At the 2020 Summer Olympics, he competed in the 68 kg weight category. In qualifying, he defeated Seydou Fofana from Mali In the 1/8 finals, he defeated two-time Olympic medalist from South Korea Lee Dae Hong. In the semi-finals, he went to dayan against Nedzad Husic (Bosnia and Herzegovina) and won a landslide victory with a score of 28:5. In the final, he defeated the British taekwondo player Bradley Sinden with a score of 34:29, winning the first gold medal at the Olympic Taekwondo Games in the history of the Uzbekistan national team.

See also 
Uzbekistan at the 2020 Summer Olympics

References

External links
 
 
 

Living people
2002 births
Place of birth missing (living people)
Uzbekistani male taekwondo practitioners
Taekwondo practitioners at the 2018 Summer Youth Olympics
Taekwondo practitioners at the 2020 Summer Olympics
Olympic taekwondo practitioners of Uzbekistan
Medalists at the 2020 Summer Olympics
Olympic gold medalists for Uzbekistan
Olympic medalists in taekwondo
21st-century Uzbekistani people